KASH-FM (107.5 MHz) is a commercial country music radio station in Anchorage, Alaska.  It is owned by iHeartMedia, Inc.  Its studios are located at Dimond Center in Anchorage, and its transmitter is located in Eagle River, Alaska.

History
The station signed on the air on December 1, 1985. On June 3, 1990, the station's building was heavily damaged by a fire.

Former logo

References

External links
 
 

1985 establishments in Alaska
Country radio stations in the United States
IHeartMedia radio stations
Radio stations established in 1985
ASH